Courts of Alaska include:
;State courts of Alaska
Alaska Supreme Court
Alaska Court of Appeals
Alaska Superior Court (4 districts containing 40 judgeships)
Alaska District Court (21 judgeships)

Federal courts located in Alaska
United States District Court for the District of Alaska

References

See also
Judiciary of Alaska

External links
National Center for State Courts – directory of state court websites.

Courts in the United States